Delmas Shipping, based in Le Havre, France, was a containerized-freight and ro-ro shipping company, mainly carrying trade between western Europe and Africa. It was the largest cargo carrier between European and African ports, and Europe's oldest extant shipping line. Delmas is wholly owned by the CMA CGM Group, having been acquired from the Bolloré Group for €470 million in 2005. The Delmas brand was fully integrated into CMA CGM in March 2016.

History 
Delmas Freres was founded by Julien & Frank Delmas in 1867 to transport coal and raw materials from the French port of La Rochelle. In 1910 the company was renamed Delmas Vieljeux after its president, joint owner and Mayor of La Rochelle, Leonce Vieljeux.

The first Delmas shipyard opened in 1922 and international shipping began in 1925 with imports of mahogany from the African state of Gabon for use in boxes for storage of butter and cheese. After World War II  the company relocated to Le Havre and began to specialise in Africa-European trade. It was acquired by the Bolloré Group in a hostile takeover in 1996, but a series of restructures led to a loss of market share and the sacking of 140 staff.

In September 2005 the company was sold to CMA CGM for €470 million. The sale was supported by the Delmas workforce after CMA CGM agreed to a package including no forced redundancies and the retention of the Le Havre offices and Delmas branding. However, the CMA CGM group announced in March 2016 that it will integrate the Delmas brand with its own in order to streamline service and unify all of its maritime activities to and from Africa under a single brand.

In February 2010, Delmas was put in the spotlight for its involvement in the shipment of illegally logged rainforest wood from Madagascar.

External links
 Delmas official website

References

Shipping companies of France
Container shipping companies